Tschitscherinellus is a genus of beetles in the family Carabidae, containing the following species:

 Tschitscherinellus cordatus (Dejean, 1825)
 Tschitscherinellus oxygonus (Chaudoir, 1850)

References

Harpalinae